Egan may refer to:

People
 Egan (surname)
 Egan (given name)

Places in the United States
 Egan, Illinois, an unincorporated community
 Egan, Louisiana, an unincorporated community and census-designated place
 Egan, South Dakota, a city
 Egan, Tennessee, an unincorporated community
 Egan, Texas, an unincorporated community
 Egan Range, a mountain range in Nevada

Other uses
 Egan Center, a convention center in Fairbanks, Alaska, United States
 Egan Junior High School, Los Altos, California
 Charles Egan Gallery, New York
 Redwood Castle, also known as Egan Castle, a Norman castle in County Tipperary, Ireland

See also 
 Egan v Canada, a 1995 civil rights of the Supreme Court of Canada
 Egan v Willis, a decision of the High Court of Australia
 Eagan (disambiguation)